Robert Victor Campbell was a unionist politician in Northern Ireland.

Campbell was an Ulster Unionist Party (UUP) alderman in North Down, and on 23 November 1972, he was made a freeman of the Borough of North Down – only the sixth person to receive the title.  At the 1973 Northern Ireland local elections, he was elected to the reconstituted North Down Borough Council, topping the poll in North Down C, and he was also elected at the 1973 Northern Ireland Assembly election in North Down.

Campbell subsequently resigned from the UUP and joined the Unionist Party of Northern Ireland.  He stood again in North Down for the Northern Ireland Constitutional Convention, but was not elected, and did not contest his council seat in 1977.

References

Year of birth missing
Possibly living people
Members of North Down Borough Council
Members of the Northern Ireland Assembly 1973–1974
Ulster Unionist Party councillors
Unionist Party of Northern Ireland politicians
Politicians from County Down